"Icarus" is an electronic single by DJ/remixer/musician R3hab. The track became the Dutch–Moroccan's first solo number one single in the United States (and his second, as a featured artist on Havana Brown and Prophet's "Big Banana") on Billboard's Dance Club Songs chart, reaching the summit in its December 24, 2016 issue.

Track listing

Charts

References

External links
Official Video at YouTube

 

2016 songs
2016 singles
R3hab songs
Electronic dance music songs